The Killer (released in the United States as Sacred Knives of Vengeance) is a 1972 Hong Kong martial arts film directed by Chor Yuen.

Release
The film was released in Hong Kong on August 1, 1972.

Reception
From contemporary reviews, Tom Milne of the Monthly Film Bulletin reviewed a dubbed version of the film.  Milne found the film to be a "rather tired offering form the Hong Kong conveyor-belt" while noting the film begins well enough with the hero "arriving in town to confound one and all with his dazzling display of town-taming karate chops and kangaroo hops. It also end swell with the las-minute intervention of a genuine Japanese samurai, heralded by a mysterious sound in an apparently empty house as something falls, and one by one the panels of a screen topple over to reveal him in full regalia, ready to challenge the heroes to the only fight in the film staged with any style or imagination." Milne concluded that the film "gets bogged down in endless, drearily identical fights and a plot which labours through its triangular complex of love and friendship."

References

External links
 
 
 English trailer

1972 films
1972 martial arts films
Shaw Brothers Studio films
1970s action films
Hong Kong action films
Hong Kong martial arts films
Kung fu films
Films directed by Chor Yuen
1970s Mandarin-language films
1970s Hong Kong films